Jamie Iannone is an American businessman, and the president and chief executive officer (CEO) of eBay, since April 27, 2020.

Early life
Iannone earned a bachelor's degree in engineering from Princeton University, and an MBA from Stanford Graduate School of Business.

Career
Iannone worked for Epinions and Booz Allen Hamilton, before joining eBay, where he worked for eight years, rising to a vice president role. He was then executive vice president of digital products at Barnes & Noble.

In 2014, Iannone joined Sam's Club, and was CEO of SamsClub.com and executive vice president of membership and technology, rising to chief operating officer (COO) for U.S. e-commerce for the parent company, Walmart.

In April 2020, it was announced that Iannone would succeed Devin Wenig as CEO of eBay (and Scott Schenkel who had been interim CEO), on April 27, 2020.

References

Living people
American chief executives
Walmart people
EBay employees
Princeton University alumni
Stanford Graduate School of Business alumni
Booz Allen Hamilton people
Year of birth missing (living people)